(Scipio in new Carthage) is an opera seria in three acts by the Italian composer Geminiano Giacomelli, with a libretto by Carlo Innocenzo Frugoni. It was dedicated to Enrichetta d'Este, and was first performed in the spring of 1730 at the old Teatro Ducale in Parma. The stage designer was Pietro Righini, the costume designer was Pietro Cotica and the choreographer was Francesco Massimiliano Pagnini.

Roles

References
Sources
 http://www.librettodopera.it/
 http://www.quellusignolo.fr/
Score
 A free score of Scipione in Cartagine nuova can be found at: http://daten.digitale-sammlungen.de/~db/0005/bsb00057642/images/

Operas
1730 operas
Italian-language operas